My Führer – The Really Truest Truth about Adolf Hitler is a 2007 German comedy-drama film directed by Dani Levy.

The setting is World War II, around New Year's of 1944. The film tells the story of Adolf Hitler and his preparation for a big New Year's speech. Hitler is too depressed to speak, so a Jewish acting coach is called in to tutor him.

The premiere was held on 9 January 2007 in Essen. Wide German release followed on 11 January and Swiss and Austrian releases on 18 and 19 January, respectively. It was entered into the 29th Moscow International Film Festival.

Plot
Professor Adolf Grünbaum, a Jewish renowned actor, introduces the story as the narrator. He wants to tell people his story, which he says may never appear in a history book.

Grünbaum is imprisoned in Sachsenhausen concentration camp with his wife and four children. In the meantime, Adolf Hitler lives in the New Reich Chancellery in bombed-out Berlin. The German propaganda machine around Reich Propaganda Minister Joseph Goebbels is preparing a mass event in Berlin's Lustgarten for New Year's Day 1944 to give the war-weary Germans new motivation. Hitler however himself is weak and confused. Grünbaum is thus released from the concentration camp to get Hitler back in shape, and to motivate him and support him as a teacher. After an initial rejection, Hitler increasingly trusts his mentor and reveals personal feelings and childhood memories to him. Grünbaum is engaged in internal conflict and repeatedly considers killing Hitler; paradoxically, he even thwarted an attempted murder of Hitler and reminded his wife that the Führer was also a victim of his childhood.

During Grünbaum's meetings with Hitler, the two are observed and wiretapped by numerous leaders. Together with the Minister of the Interior and Reichsführer SS Heinrich Himmler, Goebbels plans an assassination attempt on Hitler, which is to take place during the New Year's address, as part of a "staged reality". A bomb is to be placed under Hitler's lectern and the blame placed on Grünbaum, who is now close to Hitler. This attack is intended to strengthen the hatred of the Jews in the German people and thus contribute to the success of the war.

On the day of the speech, Hitler becomes so hoarse that he loses his voice. On Hitler's route through Berlin from the Reich Chancellery to the Lustgarten, destroyed buildings are reconstructed using panel-shaped wooden structures, so as to portray an undamaged Berlin in the film Goebbels has planned for the occasion. Grünbaum, standing under the podium, is coerced into giving the speech while Hitler ad-libs and gesticulates. Grünbaum deviates from the planned text and begins mocking Hitler before he is shot, while Hitler flees the lectern just before the bomb explodes.

Fatally injured, Grünbaum predicts that the war will soon be over and that the Führer will eventually take his own life. He notes that in a hundred years, actors will still be writing about Hitler and actors will portray him, because people will want to understand the atrocities of the Nazi regime.

Cast
 Helge Schneider as Adolf Hitler
 Ulrich Mühe as Adolf Grünbaum
 Sylvester Groth as Joseph Goebbels
 Adriana Altaras as Elsa Grünbaum
 Stefan Kurt as Albert Speer
 Ulrich Noethen as Heinrich Himmler
 Lambert Hamel as Obergruppenführer Rattenhuber
 Udo Kroschwald as Martin Bormann
 Torsten Michaelis as SS-Wachmann Moltke
 Axel Werner as Erich Kempka

References

External links
 

2007 films
2007 comedy-drama films
German comedy-drama films
2000s German-language films
Cultural depictions of Adolf Hitler
Cultural depictions of Joseph Goebbels
Films set in Berlin
Films set in the 1940s
Films directed by Dani Levy
Cultural depictions of Heinrich Himmler
Cultural depictions of Albert Speer
2000s German films